Kevin Coghlan may refer to:

Kev Coghlan (born 1988), British motorcycle rider
Kevin Coghlan (footballer) (1929–2002), Australian rules football player and commentator

See also
Coghlan (disambiguation)